Claude-Oliver Rudolph (born 30 November 1956 in Frankfurt) is a German actor, producer, screenwriter, and film director.

Internationally, he is known in the James Bond film The World Is Not Enough alongside Pierce Brosnan. Rudolph is known to German-speaking audiences, among others, from the film Das Boot and the TV series Rote Erde.

Claude-Oliver Rudolph dubbed the film The Wrestler.

In 2011 Rudolph acquired the rights to protect the name of Hans Albers' biography. Along with Frank Otto wanted Rudolph by his own admission a movie and a musical called Hans Albers - the blonde rebel publish. To date, no implementation has taken place (as of January 2020).

Rudolph has worked for the television broadcaster RT (formerly "Russia Today") since April 2016. There he worked under the editor-in-chief Ivan Rodionow as "Head of Art and Culture" with his own program Clash. From 18 September 2016 to 16 June 2019, he hosted 26 episodes of the talk show.

Partial filmography
Actor

Palermo or Wolfsburg (1980) - Mann
Das Boot (1981) - Ario
Operation Leo (1981) - Willy
 (1985) - Frank
The Journey (1986) - Schröder
The Aggression (1987) - Jakob Winkler
Blinde Leidenschaft (1988)
The Voice (1989)
Autumn Milk (1989) - Official
 (1996) - Milan
Life Is a Bluff (1996) - Schleimer
Die 3 Posträuber (1998) - Krummer Otto
The World Is Not Enough (1999) - Colonel Akakievich
Le club des chômeurs (2003) - Un touriste allemand
Dirty Sky (2003)
Chaostage (2009) - Brunner
Kopf oder Zahl (2009) - Schrotthändler Karl
Cargo (2009) - Igor Prokoff
Gegengerade (2011) - Dr. Hennings
Fahr zur Hölle (2011) - Gabriel
Robin Hood: Ghosts of Sherwood (2012) - Guy of Gisbourne
Mann im Spagat: Pace, Cowboy, Pace (2016) - Der Teufel vom Hermanplatz
Alice: The Darkest Hour (2018) - The doctor
Breakdown Forest - Reise in den Abgrund (2019) - Ruprecht Knochenhauer
Knorx (2019) - Förster

Director
  (1993)

References

External links

 Claude-Oliver Rudolph official website (in German)
 

1956 births
German male actors
Living people